Annual Waltz is an album by American musician John Hartford, released in 1986 (see 1986 in music).

Track listing
All songs by John Hartford unless otherwise noted.
"All in My Love for You" – 2:25
"Ohio River Rag" – 3:57
"Annual Waltz" – 3:52
"Gone, Gone, Gone" (Harlan Howard) – 1:54
"Love Wrote This Song" (Hartford, Charles Cochran) – 2:43
"Learning to Smile All Over Again" – 3:26
"Pennington Bend" – 3:45
"Here's to Your Dreams" – 4:14
"Short Life of Trouble" – 1:36
"Living in the Mississippi Valley" – 1:55

Personnel
John Hartford – banjo, fiddle, guitar, harmony vocals
Mark Howard – guitar, mandolin
Roy Huskey, Jr. – bass
Jack Clement – guitar
Kenny Malone – percussion
Jonathan Yudkin – fiddle, mandolin
Gary Janney – harmony vocals
Production notes:
Jack Clement – producer
Richard Adler – mixing
Milan Bogdan – master tape preparation
Camile Engel – design
Simon Levy – art direction
Glenn Meadows – master tape preparation
Mark Howard – engineer, mixing

References

External links
LP Discography of John Hartford.

John Hartford albums
1986 albums